Luis Ríos (born 30 May 1953) is an Argentine biathlete. He competed at the 1980 Winter Olympics, the 1984 Winter Olympics and the 1992 Winter Olympics.

References

External links
 

1953 births
Living people
Argentine male biathletes
Olympic biathletes of Argentina
Biathletes at the 1980 Winter Olympics
Biathletes at the 1984 Winter Olympics
Biathletes at the 1992 Winter Olympics
Skiers from Buenos Aires